The Southern Poverty Law Center (SPLC) is an American 501(c)(3) nonprofit legal advocacy organization specializing in civil rights and public interest litigation. Based in Montgomery, Alabama, it is known for its legal cases against white supremacist groups, for its classification of hate groups and other extremist organizations, and for promoting tolerance education programs. The SPLC was founded by Morris Dees, Joseph J. Levin Jr., and Julian Bond in 1971 as a civil rights law firm in Montgomery. Bond served as president of the board between 1971 and 1979.

In 1980, the SPLC began a litigation strategy of filing civil suits for monetary damages on behalf of the victims of violence from the Ku Klux Klan. The SPLC also became involved in other civil rights causes, including cases to challenge what it sees as institutional racial segregation and discrimination, inhumane and unconstitutional conditions in prisons and detention centers, discrimination based on sexual orientation, mistreatment of illegal immigrants, and the unconstitutional mixing of church and state. The SPLC has provided information about hate groups to the Federal Bureau of Investigation (FBI) and other law enforcement agencies.

Since the 2000s, the SPLC's classification and listings of hate groups (organizations it has assessed either "attack or malign an entire class of people, typically for their immutable characteristics") and extremists have often been described as authoritative and are widely accepted and cited in academic and media coverage of such groups and related issues. The SPLC's listings have also been the subject of criticism from those who argue that some of the SPLC's listings are overbroad, politically motivated, or unwarranted. There have also been accusations of misuse or unnecessarily extravagant use of funds by the organization, leading some employees to call the headquarters "Poverty Palace".

In 2019, founder Morris Dees was fired, which was followed by President Richard Cohen's resignation. An outside consultant, Tina Tchen, was brought in to review workplace practices, particularly relating to accusations of racial and sexual harassment. Margaret Huang, who was formerly the Chief Executive at Amnesty International USA, was named as president and CEO of the SPLC in early February 2020.

History

The Southern Poverty Law Center was founded by civil rights lawyers Morris Dees and Joseph J. Levin Jr. in August 1971 as a law firm originally focused on issues such as fighting poverty, racial discrimination and the death penalty in the United States. Dees asked civil rights leader Julian Bond to serve as president, a largely honorary position; he resigned in 1979 but remained on the board of directors until his death in 2015.

In 1979, Dees and the SPLC began filing civil lawsuits against Ku Klux Klan chapters and similar organizations for monetary damages on behalf of their victims. The favorable verdicts from these suits served to bankrupt the KKK and other targeted organizations. According to a 1996 article in the New York Times, Dees and the SPLC "have been credited with devising innovative legal ways to cripple hate groups, including seizing their assets." Some civil libertarians said that SPLC's tactics chill free speech and set legal precedents that could be applied against activist groups which are not hate groups.

In 1981, the Center began its Klanwatch project to monitor the activities of the KKK. That project, now called Hatewatch, was later expanded to include seven other types of hate organizations.

In 1986, the entire legal staff of the SPLC, excluding Dees, resigned as the organization shifted from traditional civil rights work toward fighting right-wing extremism.

In 1989, the Center unveiled its Civil Rights Memorial, which was designed by Maya Lin.

In 1995, the Montgomery Advertiser won a Pulitzer Prize recognition for work that probed management self-interest, questionable practices, and employee racial discrimination allegations in the SPLC.

The Center's "Teaching Tolerance" project was initiated in 1991.

In 2008, the SPLC and Dees were featured on National Geographics Inside American Terror explaining their litigation strategy against the Ku Klux Klan.

In 2011, the SPLC was "involved in high-profile state fights",  including the battle over the Georgia House Bill 87 (HB 87). The SPLC joined with the ACLU, the Asian Law Caucus, and the National Immigration Law Center in June 2011, to file a lawsuit challenging HB 87. which resulted in a permanent injunction in 2013 blocking multiple provisions of the law.

In 2013 "Teaching Tolerance" was cited as "of the most widely read periodicals dedicated to diversity and social justice in education".

In 2016, the SPLC's "ranks swelled" and its "endowment surged" after President Donald Trump was elected, resulting in the hiring of 200 new employees.

In March 2019 founder Morris Dees was fired, and in April Karen Baynes-Dunning was named as interim president and CEO. After a "tumultuous year", in mid-December 2019, staff at the SPLC voted to unionize, with 142 in favor and 45 against. The SPLC had "long been dogged by accusations of internal discrimination against minority employees, particularly in the area of promotions."

A new president and CEO, Margaret Huang, was named in early February 2020.

More recently, the SPLC and the ACLU have been involved in "battles over the treatment of inmates in the state's prisons", including an emergency request in April 2020 for the "release of tens of thousands of people in ICE custody" if ICE cannot provide protection for vulnerable inmates during the COVID-19 pandemic. The federal court injunction was filed as part of an existing class-action lawsuit regarding conditions in ICE facilities. In 2018, The SPLC filed suits related to the conditions of incarceration for adults and juveniles.

Leadership upheaval amid harassment allegations
In the spring of 2019, an assistant legal director resigned "over racial and gender equity concerns at the organization," according to the Montgomery Advertiser.

In March 2019, the SPLC fired founder Morris Dees for undisclosed reasons and removed his bio from its website. In a statement regarding the firing, the SPLC announced it would be bringing in an "outside organization to conduct a comprehensive assessment of our internal climate and workplace practices."

Following the dismissal, a letter signed by two dozen SPLC employees was sent to management, expressing concern that "allegations of mistreatment, sexual harassment, gender discrimination, and racism threaten the moral authority of this organization and our integrity along with it." One former employee wrote that the "unchecked power of lavishly compensated white men at the top" of the SPLC contributed to a culture which made black and female employees the targets of harassment.

A week later, President Richard Cohen and legal director Rhonda Brownstein announced their resignations amid the internal upheaval.  The associate legal director quit, alleging concerns regarding workplace culture.  Cohen said, "Whatever problems exist at the SPLC happened on my watch, so I take responsibility for them."

Administration
In early February 2020, Margaret Huang, who was formerly the Chief Executive at Amnesty International USA, was named as president and CEO of the SPLC. Huang replaced Karen Baynes-Dunning, a former juvenile court judge, who had served as interim president and CEO since April 2019, after founder Morris Dees was fired in March 2019.  The SPLC had appointed Tina Tchen, a former chief of staff for former first lady Michelle Obama, to review and investigate any issues with the organization's workplace environment related to Dees' firing.

Fundraising and finances
The SPLC's activities, including litigation, are supported by fundraising efforts, and it does not accept any fees or share in legal judgments awarded to clients it represents in court. Starting in 1974, the SPLC set aside money for its endowment stating that it was "convinced that the day [would] come when non-profit groups [would] no longer be able to rely on support through mail because of posting and printing costs".

The Los Angeles Times reported that by 2017, the SPLC's financial resources "nearly totaled half a billion dollars in assets". For 2018, its endowment was approximately $471 million per its annual report and SPLC spent 49% of its revenue on programs. According to the Montgomery Advertiser, the SPLC had received "significant financial support" with revenues almost "$122 million and total assets of $492.3 million", as of September 30, 2018. For the fiscal year ending October 31, 2021, SPLC reported revenue of $133 million and total assets of $801 million, including $770 million in investments. 

Prior to his departure in 2019, Dee's "role at the Center was focused on 'donor relations' and "expanding the Center's financial resources".

Charity ratings
In September 2019, based on 2018 figures, Charity Navigator rated the SPLC four out of four stars. The Center received an overall score of 90.96 (out of 100) up from its 2016 rating of 85.5, 87.58 on financial health matters up from 79.7 in 2016, and 97 on accountability and transparency, the same rating as in 2016. Charity Navigator included in their report that the SPLC had 1,165,240 followers on Facebook and 6 legal practice groups and were monitoring 1,020 hate groups.

SPLC also earned the GuideStar Platinum Seal of Transparency, which is given to organizations that voluntarily share the "measures of progress and results they use to pursue their mission."

In March 2019, CharityWatch downgraded the SPLC from B to F because the SPLC has "6.6 years worth of available assets in reserve." The SPLC spent only 64 percent of its funds on its programs. It cost $15 to raise $100. According to CharityWatch, the SPLC's total expenses, as of March 2019, amounted to $74,000,000 and contributions totaled $111,000,000.

Criminal attacks and plots against the SPLC
In July 1983, the SPLC headquarters was firebombed, destroying the building and records. In February 1985, Klansmen Joe M. Garner and Roy T. Downs Jr., along with Klan sympathizer Charles Bailey, pleaded guilty to conspiring to intimidate, oppress and threaten members of black organizations represented by SPLC. The SPLC built a new headquarters building from 1999 to 2001.

In 1984, Morris Dees became an assassination target of The Order, a revolutionary white supremacist group. By 2007, according to Dees, more than 30 people had been jailed in connection with plots to kill him or to blow up SPLC offices.

In 1995, four men were indicted for planning to blow up the SPLC headquarters. In May 1998, three white supremacists were arrested for allegedly planning a nationwide campaign of assassinations and bombings targeting Morris Dees and his Southern Poverty Law Center in Alabama as well as the Simon Wiesenthal Center in Los Angeles, the Anti-Defamation League in New York, an undisclosed federal judge in Illinois and a black radio show host in Missouri.

Notable SPLC civil cases on behalf of clients
The Southern Poverty Law Center has initiated a number of civil cases seeking injunctive relief and monetary awards on behalf of its clients. The SPLC has said it does not accept any portion of monetary judgments.

Sims v. Amos (1974)
An early SPLC case was Sims v. Amos (consolidated with Nixon v. Brewer) in which the U.S. District Court for the Middle of Alabama ordered the state legislature to reapportion its election system. The result of the decision, which the U.S. Supreme Court affirmed, was that fifteen black legislators were elected in 1974.

Brown v. Invisible Empire, KKK (1980)
In 1979, the Klan began a summer of attacks against civil rights groups, beginning in Alabama. In Decatur, Alabama, Klan members clashed with a group of civil rights marchers. There were a hundred Klan members carrying "bats, ax handles and guns". A black woman, Bernice Brown, was shot and other marchers were violently attacked. In Brown v. Invisible Empire, Knights of the Ku Klux Klan, filed in 1980 in the USDC Northern District of Alabama, the SPLC sued the Invisible Empire, Knights of the Ku Klux Klan on behalf of plaintiffs, Brown and other black marchers. The civil suit which was settled in 1990, "required Klansmen to pay damages, perform community service, and refrain from white supremacist activity." Chalmers wrote in Backfire, that the Klan had been in serious decline since the end of the 1970s. He described the "Klan summer of 1979", as a "catastrophe" for the Klan, as the SPLC's newly established Klanwatch, which became a "powerful weapon" that "tracked and litigated" the Klan. According to Chalmers, "[b]eginning with the Decatur street confrontation, the SPLC's Klanwatch began suing various Klans in federal court for civil rights violations", and as a result, the Klan lost credibility and its resources were depleted.  As a result of the SPLC, the FBI reopen their case against the Klan, and "nine Klansmen were eventually convicted of criminal charges" related to the Decatur confrontation of 1979.

Vietnamese fishermen (1981)
In 1981, the SPLC took Ku Klux Klan leader Louis Beam's Klan-associated militia, the Texas Emergency Reserve (TER), to court to stop racial harassment and intimidation of Vietnamese shrimpers in and around Galveston Bay. The Klan's actions against approximately 100 Vietnamese shrimpers in the area included a cross burning, sniper fire aimed at them, and arsonists burning their boats.

In May 1981, U.S. District Court judge Gabrielle McDonald issued a preliminary injunction against the Klan, requiring them to cease intimidating, threatening, or harassing the Vietnamese. McDonald eventually found the TER and Beam liable for tortious interference, violations of the Sherman Antitrust Act, and of various civil rights statutes and thus permanently enjoined them against violence, threatening behavior, and other harassment of the Vietnamese shrimpers. The SPLC also uncovered an obscure Texas law "that forbade private armies in that state". McDonald found that Beam's organization violated it and hence ordered the TER to close its military training camp.

Person v. Carolina Knights of the Ku Klux Klan (1982)
In 1982, armed members of the Carolina Knights of the Ku Klux Klan terrorized Bobby Person, a black prison guard, and members of his family. They harassed and threatened others, including a white woman who had befriended blacks. In 1984, Person became the lead plaintiff in Person v. Carolina Knights of the Ku Klux Klan, a lawsuit brought by the SPLC in the United States District Court for the Eastern District of North Carolina. The harassment and threats continued during litigation and the court issued an order prohibiting any person from interfering with others inside the courthouse. In January 1985, the court issued a consent order that prohibited the group's "Grand Dragon", Frazier Glenn Miller Jr., and his followers from operating a paramilitary organization, holding parades in black neighborhoods, and from harassing, threatening or harming any black person or white persons who associated with black persons. Subsequently, the court dismissed the plaintiffs' claim for damages.

Within a year, the court found Miller and his followers, now calling themselves the White Patriot Party, in criminal contempt for violating the consent order. Miller was sentenced to six months in prison followed by a three-year probationary period, during which he was banned from associating with members of any racist group such as the White Patriot Party. Miller refused to obey the terms of his probation. He made underground "declarations of war" against Jews and the federal government before being arrested again. Found guilty of weapons violations, he went to federal prison for three years.

United Klans of America
In 1987, SPLC won a case against the United Klans of America for the lynching of Michael Donald, a black teenager in Mobile, Alabama. The SPLC used an unprecedented legal strategy of holding an organization responsible for the crimes of individual members to help produce a $7 million judgment for the victim's mother. The verdict forced United Klans of America into bankruptcy. Its national headquarters was sold for approximately $52,000 to help satisfy the judgment. In 1987, five members of a Klan offshoot, the White Patriot Party, were indicted for stealing military weaponry and plotting to kill Dees. The SPLC has since successfully used this precedent to force numerous Ku Klux Klan and other hate groups into bankruptcy.

White Aryan Resistance
On November 13, 1988, in Portland, Oregon, three white supremacist members of East Side White Pride and White Aryan Resistance (WAR) fatally assaulted Mulugeta Seraw, an Ethiopian man who came to the United States to attend college. In October 1990, the SPLC won a civil case on behalf of Seraw's family against WAR's operator Tom Metzger and his son, John, for a total of $12.5 million. The Metzgers declared bankruptcy, and WAR went out of business. The cost of work for the trial was absorbed by the Anti-Defamation League (ADL) as well as the SPLC. , Metzger still makes payments to Seraw's family.

Church of the Creator
In May 1991, Harold Mansfield, a black U.S. Navy war veteran, was murdered by George Loeb, a member of the neo-Nazi "Church of the Creator" (now called the Creativity Movement). SPLC represented the victim's family in a civil case and won a judgment of $1 million from the church in March 1994. The church transferred ownership to William Pierce, head of the National Alliance, to avoid paying money to Mansfield's heirs. The SPLC filed suit against Pierce for his role in the fraudulent scheme and won an $85,000 judgment against him in 1995. The amount was upheld on appeal and the money was collected prior to Pierce's death in 2002.

Christian Knights of the KKK
The SPLC won a $37.8 million verdict on behalf of Macedonia Baptist Church, a 100-year-old black church in Manning, South Carolina, against two Ku Klux Klan chapters and five Klansmen (Christian Knights of the Ku Klux Klan and Invisible Empire, Inc.) in July 1998. The money was awarded stemming from arson convictions; these Klan units burned down the historic black church in 1995. Morris Dees told the press, "If we put the Christian Knights out of business, what's that worth? We don't look at what we can collect. It's what the jury thinks this egregious conduct is worth that matters, along with the message it sends." According to The Washington Post the amount is the "largest-ever civil award for damages in a hate crime case."

Aryan Nations
In September 2000, the SPLC won a $6.3 million judgment against the Aryan Nations via an Idaho jury who awarded punitive and compensatory damages to a woman and her son who were attacked by Aryan Nations guards. The lawsuit stemmed from the July 1998 attack when security guards at the Aryan Nations compound near Hayden Lake in northern Idaho, shot at Victoria Keenan and her son. Bullets struck their car several times, causing the car to crash. An Aryan Nations member held the Keenans at gunpoint. As a result of the judgment, Richard Butler turned over the  compound to the Keenans, who sold the property to a philanthropist. He donated the land to North Idaho College, which designated the area as a "peace park".

Ten Commandments monument

In 2002, the SPLC and the American Civil Liberties Union filed suit (Glassroth v. Moore) against Alabama Supreme Court Chief Justice Roy Moore for placing a display of the Ten Commandments in the rotunda of the Alabama Judicial Building. Moore, who had final authority over what decorations were to be placed in the Alabama State Judicial Building's Rotunda, had installed a 5,280 pound (2,400 kg) granite block, three feet wide by three feet deep by four feet tall, of the Ten Commandments late at night without the knowledge of any other court justice. After defying several court rulings, Moore was eventually removed from the court and the Supreme Court justices had the monument removed from the building.

Leiva v. Ranch Rescue

In 2003, the SPLC, the Mexican American Legal Defense and Educational Fund, and local attorneys filed a civil suit, Leiva v. Ranch Rescue, in Jim Hogg County, Texas, against Ranch Rescue, a vigilante paramilitary group and several of its associates, seeking damages for assault and illegal detention of two illegal immigrants caught near the U.S.-Mexico border. In April 2005, SPLC obtained judgments totaling $1 million against Casey James Nethercott, who was then Ranch Rescue's leader and the owner of an Arizona ranch, Camp Thunderbird, Joe Sutton, who owned the Hebbronville ranch on which two illegal immigrants has been caught trespassing on March 18, 2003, and Jack Foote, the founder of Ranch Rescue. Sutton, who had recruited Ranch Rescue to patrol the U.S.-Mexico border region near his Hebbronville ranch, settled with an $100,000 out-of-court settlement. According to the New York Times, since neither Nethercott or Foote defended themselves, the "judge issued default judgments of $850,000 against Mr. Nethercott and $500,000 against Mr. Foote. Neither men had "substantial assets" so Nethercott's  ranch—Camp Thunderbird—which had also served as Ranch Rescue's headquarters—was seized to pay the judgment and surrendered to the two illegal immigrants from El Salvador, Edwin Alfredo Mancía Gonzáles and Fátima del Socorro Leiva Medina. SPLC staff worked also with Texas prosecutors to obtain a conviction against Nethercott for possession of a gun, which was illegal for a felon.  Nethercott had served time in California for assault previously. As a result, he was sentenced to serve a five-year sentence in a Texas prison.

Billy Ray Johnson
The SPLC brought a civil suit on behalf of Billy Ray Johnson, a black, mentally disabled man, who was severely beaten by four white males in Texas and left bleeding in a ditch, suffering permanent injuries. In 2007, Johnson was awarded $9 million in damages by a Linden, Texas jury. At a criminal trial, the four men were convicted of assault and received sentences of 30 to 60 days in county jail.

Imperial Klans of America
In November 2008, the SPLC's case against the Imperial Klans of America (IKA), the nation's second-largest Klan organization, went to trial in Meade County, Kentucky. The SPLC had filed suit for damages in July 2007 on behalf of Jordan Gruver and his mother against the IKA in Kentucky. In July 2006, five Klan members went to the Meade County Fairgrounds in Brandenburg, Kentucky, "to hand out business cards and flyers advertising a 'white-only' IKA function". Two members of the Klan started calling Gruver, a 16-year-old boy of Panamanian descent, a "spic". As a result, the victim received "two cracked ribs, a broken left forearm, multiple cuts and bruises and jaw injuries requiring extensive dental repair."

In a related criminal case in February 2007, Jarred Hensley and Andrew Watkins were sentenced to three years in prison for beating Gruver. On November 14, 2008, an all-white jury of seven men and seven women awarded $1.5 million in compensatory damages and $1 million in punitive damages to the plaintiff against Ron Edwards, Imperial Wizard of the group, and Jarred Hensley, who participated in the attack.

Mississippi correctional institutions

Together with the ACLU National Prison Project, the SPLC filed a class-action suit in November 2010 against the owner/operators of the private Walnut Grove Youth Correctional Facility in Leake County, Mississippi, and the Mississippi Department of Corrections (MDC). They charged that conditions, including under-staffing and neglect of medical care, produced numerous and repeated abuses of youthful prisoners, high rates of violence and injury, and that one prisoner suffered brain damage because of inmate-on-inmate attacks. A federal civil rights investigation was undertaken by the United States Department of Justice. In settling the suit, Mississippi ended its contract with GEO Group in 2012. Additionally, under the court decree, the MDC moved the youthful offenders to state-run units. In 2012, Mississippi opened a new youthful offender unit at the Central Mississippi Correctional Facility in Rankin County. The state also agreed to not subject youthful offenders to solitary confinement and a court monitor conducted regular reviews of conditions at the facility.

Also with the ACLU Prison Project, the SPLC filed a class-action suit in May 2013 against Management and Training Corporation (MTC), the for-profit operator of the private East Mississippi Correctional Facility, and the MDC. Management and Training Corporation had been awarded a contract for this and two other facilities in Mississippi in 2012 following the removal of GEO Group. The suit charged failure of MTC to make needed improvements, and to maintain proper conditions and treatment for this special needs population of prisoners. In 2015 the court granted the plaintiffs' motion for class certification.

Polk County, Florida Sheriff
In 2012, the SPLC initiated a class action federal lawsuit against the Polk County, Florida sheriff, Grady Judd, alleging that seven juveniles confined by the sheriff were suffering in improper conditions. U.S. District Court Judge Steven D. Merryday found in favor of Judd, who said the SPLC's allegations "were not supported by the facts or court precedence ." The judge wrote that "the conditions of juvenile detention at (Central County Jail) are not consistent with (Southern Poverty's) dark, grim, and condemning portrayal." While the county sheriff's department did not recover an estimated $1 million in attorney's fees defending the case, Judge Merryday did award $103,000 in court costs to Polk County.

Andrew Anglin and The Daily Stormer
In April 2017, the SPLC filed a federal lawsuit on behalf of Tanya Gersh, accusing Andrew Anglin, publisher of the white supremacist website The Daily Stormer, of instigating an anti-Semitic harassment campaign against Gersh, a Whitefish, Montana, real estate agent.<ref name=TPMAnglin>Kirkland, Allegra (April 18, 2017). "Lawsuit: Neo-Nazi Led Anti-Semitic Harassment Campaign Against Montana Woman". Talking Points Memo". Retrieved May 16, 2017</ref> In July 2019, a judge issued a $14 million dollar default judgment against Anglin, who is in hiding and has refused to appear in court.

Lawsuits and criticism against the SPLC

In October 2014, the SPLC added Ben Carson to its extremist watch list, citing his association with groups it considers extreme, and his "linking of gays with pedophiles". Following criticism, the SPLC concluded its profile of Carson did not meet its standards, removed his listing, and apologized to him in February 2015.

In October 2016, the SPLC published its "Field Guide to Anti-Muslim Extremists", which listed the British activist Maajid Nawaz and a nonprofit group he founded, the Quilliam Foundation. Nawaz, who identifies as a "liberal, reform Muslim", denounced the listing as a "smear", saying that the SPLC listing had made him a target of jihadists.Maajid Nawaz Interview Real Time with Bill Maher (HBO) In June 2018, the SPLC issued an apology, stating:

Along with the apology, the SPLC paid US$3.375 million to Nawaz and the Quilliam Foundation in a settlement. Nawaz said about the settlement that Quilliam "will continue to combat extremists by defying Muslim stereotypes, calling out fundamentalism in our own communities, and speaking out against anti-Muslim hate."SPLC to pay $3.4 million to British group it called anti-Muslim extremists. Associated Press, June 18, 2018 The SPLC ultimately removed the Field Guide from its website.

In August 2017, a defamation lawsuit was filed against the SPLC by the D. James Kennedy Ministries for describing it as an "active hate group" because of their views on LGBT rights. The SPLC lists D. James Kennedy Ministries and its predecessor, Truth in Action, as anti-LGBT hate groups because of what the SPLC describes as the group's history of spreading homophobic propaganda, including D. James Kennedy's false statement that "homosexuals prey on adolescent boys", and false claims about the transmission of AIDS. On February 21, 2018, a federal magistrate judge recommended that the suit be dismissed with prejudice, concluding that D. James Kennedy Ministries could not show that it had been libeled. On September 19, 2019, the lawsuit was dismissed by Judge Myron H. Thompson, who ruled that the "SPLC's labeling of the group as [a hate group] is protected by the First Amendment."

In March 2018, several journalists, including Max Blumenthal, were mentioned in an article by Alexander Reid Ross which the SPLC retracted after receiving complaints from those journalists that the article falsely portrayed them as "white supremacists, fascists, anti-Semites, and engaging in a conspiracy with the Putin regime to promote such views"; the Center's letter explaining its retraction of the article apologizing to Blumenthal and the other journalists who believed they had been falsely portrayed. The SPLC was criticized for taking down this article and was accused of caving in to pressure. The article argued that the dissemination of conspiracy theories around such issues as the Syrian Civil War (about the White Helmets and child refugees) were intended to co-opt leftist anti-imperialism in the service of a fascist agenda. Subsequently, the SPLC retracted two other articles written by Alexander Reid Ross on the topic of Russian campaigns to influence Western public opinion.

In 2019, the Center for Immigration Studies (CIS) sued the SPLC for designating the CIS as a hate group, claiming it constituted fraud under the Racketeer Influenced and Corrupt Organizations Act. The SPLC defended its decision and said the group "richly deserved" the designation. Cornell law professor William A. Jacobson, a longtime critic of the SPLC, criticized the listing of the CIS as "pos[ing] a danger of being exploited as an excuse to silence speech and to skew political debate." The lawsuit was dismissed in September 2019 for failure to state a claim; Judge Amy Berman Jackson ruled that the CIS could not show any violations of the RICO statute.

In February 2019, several months after resigning as chairman of the Proud Boys, Gavin McInnes filed a defamation lawsuit against the SPLC. The lawsuit was filed in federal court in Alabama over the SPLC's designation of the Proud Boys as a "general hate" group.Kennedy, Merrit (February 5, 2019). "Proud Boys Founder Files Defamation Lawsuit Against Southern Poverty Law Center". NPR.  Retrieved October 7, 2020. The SPLC took the lawsuit "as a compliment" and an indication that "we're doing our job." On its website, SPLC said that "McInnes plays a duplicitous rhetorical game: rejecting white nationalism and, in particular, the term 'alt-right' while espousing some of its central tenets" and that the group's "rank-and-file [members] and leaders regularly spout white nationalist memes and maintain affiliations with known extremists. They are known for anti-Muslim and misogynistic rhetoric. Proud Boys have appeared alongside other hate groups at extremist gatherings like the Unite the Right rally in Charlottesville." McInnes is represented by Ronald Coleman. In addition to defamation, McInnes claimed tortious interference with economic advantage, "false light invasion of privacy" and "aiding and abetting employment discrimination". The day after filing the suit, McInnes announced that he had been re-hired by the Canadian far-right media group The Rebel Media. The SPLC filed a motion to dismiss the lawsuit in July 2019.

Projects and publishing platforms

Hate Map

In 1990, the SPLC began to publish an "annual census of hate groups operating within the United States".

Classifications and listings of hate groups

Over the years the classifications and listings of hate groups expanded to reflect current social phenomena. By the 2000s, the term "hate groups" included organizations it has assessed either "attack or malign an entire class of people, typically for their immutable characteristics". The SPLC says that hate group activities may include speeches, marches, rallies, meetings, publishing, and leafleting. While some of these activities may include criminal acts, such as violence, not all the activities tracked by the SPLC are illegal or criminal.

Groups that have been included as "hate groups" by the SPLC who reject that labelling include, for example, self-described men's rights groups A Voice for Men and Return of Kings, which the SPLC had described as "male supremacist", according to a 2018 Washington Post article.

The SPLC's identification and listings of hate groups and extremists has been the subject of controversy. The authors of the 2009 book The White Separatist Movement in the United States, sociologists Betty A. Dobratz and Stephanie L. Shanks-Meile, who used the findings of the SPLC and other watchdog groups, said that the SPLC chose its causes with funding and donations in mind. Concerns have been raised that people and groups designated as "hate groups" by the SPLC were being targeted by protests or violence that prevent them from speaking. The SPLC stands behind the vast majority of its listings. In 2018, David A. Graham wrote in The Atlantic that while criticism of the SPLC had long existed, the sources of such criticism have expanded recently to include "sympathetic observers and fellow researchers on hate groups" concerned about the organization "mixing its research and activist strains".

Laird Wilcox, an analyst of political fringe movements, has said the SPLC has taken an incautious approach to assigning the labels "hate group" and "extremist". Mark Potok of Southern Poverty Law Center responded that Wilcox "had an ax to grind for a great many years" and engaged in name calling against others doing anti-racist work.

In 2009, the Federation for American Immigration Reform (FAIR) argued that allies of America's Voice and Media Matters had used the SPLC designation of FAIR as a hate group to "engage in unsubstantiated, invidious name-calling, smearing millions of people in this movement." FAIR and its leadership have been criticized by the SPLC as being sympathetic to, or overtly supportive of, white supremacist and identitarian ideologies, as the group's late founder had stated his belief that the United States should remain a majority-white country.

In 2010, a group of Republican politicians and conservative organizations criticized the SPLC in full-page advertisements in two Washington, D.C., newspapers for what they described as "character assassination" because the SPLC had listed the Family Research Council (FRC) as a hate group for alleged "defaming of gays and lesbians".Extremist Files: Family Research Council. Southern Poverty Law Center, 2016

In August 2012, a gunman entered the Washington, D.C. headquarters of the Family Research Council with the intent to kill employees and smear Chick-fil-A sandwiches on the victims' faces. The gunman, Floyd Lee Corkins, stated that he chose FRC as a target because it was listed as an anti-gay group on the SPLC's website. A security guard was wounded but stopped Corkins from shooting anyone else. In the wake of the shooting, the SPLC was again criticized for listing FRC as an anti-gay hate group, including by liberal columnist Dana Milbank, while others defended the categorization. The SPLC defended its listing of anti-gay hate groups, stating that the groups were selected not because of their religious views, but on their "propagation of known falsehoods about LGBT people... that have been thoroughly discredited by scientific authorities."

SPLC Hatewatch (blog)
The Hatewatch blog, created in c. 2007, publishes the work of its teams, including investigative journalists who "monitor and expose" activities of the "American radical right". Initially, its precursor—the "Klanwatch" project—which was established in 1981, focused on monitoring KKK activities. The Hatewatch blog, along with the "Teaching Tolerance" program and the Intelligence Report, highlights SPLC's work.An in-depth 2018 Hatewatch report examined the roots and evolution of black-on-white crime rhetoric, from the mid-nineteenth century to the late 2010s. According to the report, "[m]isrepresented crime statistics" on "black-on-white crime" have become a "main propaganda point of America's hate movement". The report described how Dylann Roof, the perpetrator of the June 17, 2015, Charleston church shooting had written in his manifesto about his 2012 Google search for "black-on-white crime", which led him to be convinced that black men were a "physical threat to white people". One of the first sources was the Council of Conservative Citizens. The report shows that on November 22, 2015, then-Presidential Candidate Donald Trump retweeted a chart that had "originated from a neo-Nazi account" which displayed "bogus crime statistics".  The SPLC report cited a November 23, 2005, Washington Post article that fact checked the figures in the graph. The tweet said that "81 percent of whites are killed by black people", while the FBI says that only 15 percent of white murder victims are killed by a black perpetrator; the large majority of white murder victims are killed by white perpetrators.

Teaching Tolerance

SPLC's projects include the website Tolerance.org, which provides news on tolerance issues, education for children, guidebooks for activists, and resources for parents and teachers. The website received Webby Awards in 2002 and 2004 for Best Activism. Another product of Tolerance.org is the "10 Ways To Fight Hate on Campus: A Response Guide for College Activists" booklet.

Documentaries
The SPLC also produces documentary films. Two have won Academy Awards for Documentary Short Subject: A Time for Justice (1994) and Mighty Times: The Children's March (2004). In 2017 the SPLC began developing a six-part series with Black Box Management to document "the normalization of far-right extremism in the age of Donald Trump."

Cooperation with law enforcement
The SPLC cooperates with, and offers training to, law enforcement agencies, focusing "on the history, background, leaders, and activities of far-right extremists in the United States". The FBI has partnered with the SPLC and many other organizations "to establish rapport, share information, address concerns, and cooperate in solving problems" related to hate crimes. In a November 2018 briefing of law enforcement officials in Clark County, Washington, concerning the Proud Boys FBI agents suggested the use of various websites for more information, including that of the SPLC. The organization urged Chicago to fire a policeman who allegedly hid his association with the Proud Boys.

 Publications 
SPLC produces a number of publications.

Intelligence Report
Since 1981, the SPLC's Intelligence Project has published a quarterly Intelligence Report that monitors what the SPLC considers radical right hate groups and extremists in the United States. The Intelligence Report provides information regarding organizational efforts and tactics of these groups and persons, and has been cited by scholars, including Rory M. McVeigh and David Mark Chalmers, as a reliable and comprehensive source on U.S. right-wing extremism and hate groups. In 2013 the SPLC donated the Intelligence Projects documentation to the library of Duke University. The SPLC also publishes HateWatch Weekly, a newsletter that follows racism and extremism, and the Hatewatch blog, whose subtitle is "Keeping an Eye on the Radical Right".

Two articles published in Intelligence Report have won "Green Eyeshade Excellence in Journalism" awards from the Society of Professional Journalists. "Communing with the Council", written by Heidi Beirich and Bob Moser, took third place for Investigative Journalism in the Magazine Division in 2004, and "Southern Gothic", by David Holthouse and Casey Sanchez, took second place for Feature Reporting in the Magazine Division in 2007.

Since 2001, the SPLC has released an annual issue of the Intelligence Project called Year in Hate, later renamed Year in Hate and Extremism, in which it presents statistics on the numbers of hate groups in America. The current format of the report covers racial hate groups, nativist hate groups, and other right-wing extremist groups such as groups within the Patriot Movement. Jesse Walker, writing in Reason.com, criticized the 2016 report, questioning whether the count was reliable, as it focused on the number of groups rather than the number of people in those groups or the size of the groups. Walker gives the example that the 2016 report itself concedes an increase in the number of KKK groups could be due to two large groups falling apart, leading to members creating smaller local groups.

 Immigration 
SPLC also studies, works, and publishes on immigration issues. They characterize the H-2 visa guest worker program as "close to slavery".

Notable publications and media coverage on the SPLC

In May 1988, journalist John Egerton published his article entitled "The Klan Basher" in Foundation News. In July 1988, he published a similar article, entitled "Poverty Palace: How the Southern Poverty Law Center got rich fighting the Klan", in The Progressive. A 1991 book entitled Shades of Gray: Dispatches from the Modern South included a chapter by Egerton on this theme, entitled "Morris Dees and the Southern Poverty Law Center".

In 1994, the Montgomery Advertiser published an eight-part critical report on the SPLC. The series was nominated as one of three finalists for a 1995 Pulitzer Prize in Explanatory Journalism for "its probe of questionable management practices and self-interest at the Southern Poverty Law Center, the nation's best-endowed civil rights charity." According to the series, the SPLC had exaggerated the threat posed by the Klan and similar groups in order to raise money, discriminated against black employees, and used misleading fundraising tactics. From 1984 to 1994, the SPLC raised about $62 million in contributions and spent about $21 million on programs, according to the newspaper. SPLC's co-founder Joe Levin rejected the Advertiser's claims, saying that the series showed a lack of interest in the center's programs. Levin said that the newspaper had an obsessive interest in the SPLC's financial affairs and Mr. Dees' personal life, in order to smear the center and Mr. Dees."

David Mark Chalmers, who is the author of Hooded Americanism: The History of the Ku Klux Klan published in 1987, also wrote a follow up, Backfire, Backfire: How the Ku Klux Klan Helped the Civil Rights Movement in 2003, in which he described the SPLC's role in the decline of the Klan.

In 2006, a chapter on the SPLC by was published in the Encyclopedia of American civil liberties which described the history of the SPLC and its co-founder Morris Dees.

The National Geographic Channel television series included the 2008 episode entitled "Inside American Terror", which covered the SPLC's successful lawsuit against the Ku Klux Klan.In their 2009 book The White Separatist Movement in the United States: 'White Power, White Pride!, sociologists Betty A. Dobratz and Stephanie L. Shanks-Meile said that the SPLC's Klanwatch Intelligence Reports sometimes portrayed the KKK as more "militant and dangerous with higher turnouts" than what they personally had observed.

In 2013, J.M. Berger wrote in Foreign Policy that media organizations should be more cautious when citing the SPLC and ADL, arguing that they are "not objective purveyors of data".

In their 2015 book Culture Wars: An Encyclopedia of Issues, Viewpoints and Voices, Roger Chapman and James Ciment cited the criticism of SPLC by journalist Ken Silverstein, who said that the SPLC's fundraising appeals and finances were deceptive.

Laurence Leamer's 2016 book, entitled The Lynching: The Epic Courtroom Battle That Brought Down the Klan, centred around the role played by Morris Dees as SPLC's co-founder, who won the case against the Klan which provided the family of the teenager Michael Donald, lynched by the Klan in 1981 in Mobile, Alabama, with restitution from the Klan.

Marc Thiessen, in a June 2018 opinion piece for The Washington Post, asserted that the SPLC had lost its credibility and "become a caricature of itself".

In the wake of Morris Dees' dismissal in March 2019, former SPLC staffer Bob Moser published an article in The New Yorker'', "The Reckoning of Morris Dees and the Southern Poverty Law Center", in which he described his disappointment with what the SPLC had become.

Explanatory notes

References

Citations

General and cited references

Further reading

External links

 

 
1971 establishments in Alabama
African-American history of Alabama
Anti-fascist organizations in the United States
Anti-racist organizations in the United States
Civil rights organizations in the United States
Opposition to antisemitism in the United States
Organizations established in 1971
Opposition to Islamophobia
501(c)(3) organizations